is a Japanese manga series written and illustrated by Yuki Urushibara. It was serialized in Kodansha's seinen manga magazine Monthly Afternoon from November 2009 to October 2010, with its chapters collected in two tankōbon volumes.

Publication
Suiiki is written and illustrated by Yuki Urushibara. The manga was serialized in Kodansha's seinen manga magazine Monthly Afternoon from November 25, 2009 to October 25, 2010. Kodansha collected its chapters into two individual tankōbon volumes released on January 21, 2011. On the same day, Kodansha also published the series in two aizoban volumes. Kodansha re-released the series in two shinsōban volumes on May 23, 2018.

The manga is licensed in France by Ki-oon and in Spain by Milky Way Ediciones.

Volume list

References

External links

Fantasy anime and manga
Kodansha manga
Seinen manga